Members of the Macarthur family, and their descendants, the Macarthur-Onslow family, are prominent pastoral, political, and business leaders with origins in Australia and the United Kingdom. The family is renown for its pioneering development of the Australian Merino wool industry and its pastoral interests, including Camden Park Estate, Elizabeth Farm, and Hambledon Cottage. Several family members served in the military and in political life in the NSW Parliament.

Family tree

Macarthur family

 Alexander Macarthur m. 
 James Macarthur m. 
 Hannibal Hawkins Macarthur (1788–1861) m. Anna Maria, née King (???–1852), (m. 1812)
 James Campbell Macarthur (1813–1862)
 Elizabeth Macarthur (1815–1899) m. Philip Gidley King (1817–1904)
 Phillip Parker Macarthur King (1844–1902) m. Mabella Winton, née Pringle (1846–1926)
 George Bartholomew Gidley King
 John Lethbridge King
 Elizabeth Maria King (1867–1933) m. Lieutenant Henry Edward Goldfinch
 Anna Macarthur (1816–1852) m. Commander John Clements Wickham
 Charles Macarthur (1820–1871)
 Rev. George Fairfowl Macarthur (1825–1890) m. Priddle
 Margaret Isabella Priddle (?–1917) m. Dr. Walter Sigismund Brown (1861–1936)
 John Alexander Macarthur (1827–1904)
 Edward Hannibal Macarthur (1859–1947) m. Mary, née Wildash
 Annie Mary Macarthur (1866–1914) m. W. Bracker
 Arthur Hannibal Macarthur (1830–1871) m. Emmeline Helen, née Allan (1837–1904)
 Enid Emma Macarthur m. James William Macarthur—Onslow (1867–1946); also see below
 John Macarthur (1791–1862)
 John Macarthur (1797–1834) m. Elizabeth, née Veale (1766–1850)
 Sir Edward Macarthur (1789–1872) m. Sarah, née Neil in 1862
 Elizabeth Macarthur (1792–1842)
 James Macarthur (1793–1794)
 John Macarthur (1794–1831)
 Mary Isabella Macarthur (1795–1852) m. James Bowman (1784–1846)
 Isabella Macarthur m. James Kinghorne Chisholm (1830–1912)
 James Macarthur (1798–1867) m. Emily, née Stone  
 Elizabeth Macarthur (1840–1911) m. Captain Arthur Alexander Walton Onslow (1833–1882); Elizabeth changed her name to Macarthur—Onslow, following the death of her husband in 1892
 James William Macarthur—Onslow (1867–1946) m. Enid Emma, née Macarthur; also see above
 James Arthur Macarthur—Onslow (1898–1959) m. Constance, née Herbert; disinherited and bankrupted by his father
 Helen Maud Macarthur—Onslow (1899–1968) m. Major General Sir Reginald Stanham; inherited Camden Park Estate
 Brigadier Richard Quentin Macarthur—Stanham; inherited Camden Park Estate
 Elizabeth Enid Macarthur—Onslow (1903–1990) m. Frederick Rothe
 William Macarthur—Onslow; died in WWI
 Emily Susan Macarthur—Onslow (1869–1876)
 Rosa Sibella Macarthur—Onslow (1871–1943)
 Brigadier General George Macleay Macarthur—Onslow (1875–1931) m. Violet Marguerite, née Gordon (m. 16 October 1909 at Manar, near Braidwood)
 (Francis) Arthur Macarthur-Onslow (1879–1938) m. Sylvia Seton Raymond, née Chisholm (m. 16 May 1903 at Goulburn)
 Major General Sir Denzil Macarthur—Onslow (1904–1984) m. Elinor Margaret, née Caldwell (m. 1927; div. )
 Ion Macarthur—Onslow
 Neil Macarthur—Onslow
 Diana Macarthur—Onslow
 Ewan Macarthur—Onslow
 Major General Sir Denzil Macarthur—Onslow (1904–1984) m. Dorothy Wolseley Conagher, née Scott (–2013); (m. 1950 in Petersham)
 Katrina Macarthur—Onslow m. Sir Charles Hobhouse
 Lee Macarthur—Onslow (1952–2021)
 Sir William Macarthur (1800–1882)
 Emmeline Macarthur (b. 1808) m. Henry Parker

Macarthur-Onslow family

 Arthur Pooley Onslow m. Rosa Roberta, née Macleay (m. 1832)
Captain Arthur Alexander Walton Onslow (1833–1882) m. Elizabeth, née Macarthur (1840–1911); changed her name to Macarthur-Onslow in 1892
 see above for listing of subsequent generations
 Sir Alexander Campbell Onslow (1842–1908)

References 

 
Australian families
Australian people of English descent